The College of Journalism and Communications is an academic college of the University of Florida. The centerpiece of the journalism programs at UF is WUFT, which consists of both a WUFT (TV) Public Broadcasting Service (PBS) Public television and WUFT-FM NPR public radio station. The commercial broadcasting radio station, WRUF, is also one of the oldest stations in the state.

History
The college traces its origins to 1925, when the Department of Journalism was formed in Language Hall (now Anderson Hall). Orland K. "O.K." Armstrong was the first head of the department. The first three journalism degrees were awarded in 1928.

The department moved into Buckman Hall, a renovated dormitory, in 1937.

Rae O. Weimer, former managing editor at the New York City daily newspaper PM, began teaching in the Department of Journalism in 1949. In 1950, the journalism program was accredited,  although it still had only "one classroom, no equipment and only two teachers." In late 1953, broadcasting was transferred to journalism and the department became a school, the School of Journalism and Communications.

In 1967, the school became a full-fledged college. Weimer was named the first dean; the current journalism building, Weimer Hall, is named for him. 

From 1976 to 1994, Ralph Lowenstein served as dean and carried out the digital transformation of the college.

On July 1, 2021, Hub Brown assumed the role of Dean. Hub Brown was an associate dean and associate professor at the Newhouse School of Public Communications at Syracuse University. He succeeds Diane McFarlin, who retired after having served eight years in that role.

Academics
The department comprises four departments:
Department of Journalism (journalism)
Department of Media Production, Management, & Technology (MPMT)
Department of Advertising (advertising)
Department of Public Relations (public relations)

The College of Journalism and Communications offers several Bachelor of Science in Journalism, Media Production, Management, and Technology, Advertising, and Public relations. It offers Master of Arts in Journalism, mass communications, and Advertising, along with Ph.D.

The Center for Public Interest Communications
The Center for Public Interest Communications operates as a unit of the College of Journalism and Communications. The first of its kind in the nation, the Center studies, tests and helps organizations apply behavioral, cognitive and social science to create strategic communication designed to achieve positive social change.

Public interest communications is a science-driven approach to strategic communications that results in lasting change on an issue that transcends the interests of any single person or organization and advances our greater good.

The Center provides training to government agencies, universities, foundations, public interest communications agencies and nonprofits on how to incorporate elements of public interest communications in their work. It also partners with a number of organizations to help them create more effective communications strategies to drive positive social change. In addition, The Center develops workshops to share research with social change leaders and scientists to help them develop better communication strategies, and it hosts frank, an annual conference dedicated to public interest communications. It also publishes the Journal of Public Interest Communications, the first-ever, open-access, interdisciplinary journal featuring peer-reviewed research in the emerging field of public interest communications.

The Center grew out of The Frank Karel Chair in Public Interest Communications made possible by a $2 million grant made to the university in 2008 from Trellis Fund. The endowment was used to create a curriculum in public interest communications, and to mentor and advise students who plan to build careers in the field.

In May 2019, The Center for Public Interest Communications, in collaboration with UF CJC Online, launched the nation's first master's degree program in Public Interest Communications.

UF CJC Online
The College of Journalism and Mass Communications launched its online graduate program (UF CJC Online) in 2012 with an MA degree in Mass Communication with a specialization in global strategic communication. The college currently offers a master's degree with eight areas of specialization including Audience Analytics, Digital Strategy, Global Strategic Communication, Political Communication, Public Interest Communication, Public Relations, Social Media, and Web Design. Additionally, four graduate certificates are offered in Global Strategic Communication, Media Sales, Social Media and Web Design. The online graduate program has been recognized as a top rated online program (Ranked #1 online Master's in Communications Program by The Best Schools in 2019) UF CJC Online is administered by an in-house staff. Dr. Evan Kropp was named the Director of UF CJC Online in May 2019.

ABC News at UF
ABC News opened a "mini-bureau" at the College of Journalism and Communications in September 2008. It was one of five universities chosen for the ABC News on Campus program, along with Arizona State University, Syracuse University,  the University of North Carolina at Chapel Hill, and the University of Texas at Austin.

Student organizations
In October 2011, the University of Florida chapter of the Public Relations Student Society of America (PRSSA) was named Most Outstanding Chapter of the Year.

See also
 WUFT (TV)
 WUFT-FM
 WRUF (AM)

References

External links
 

Journalism and Communications
Journalism schools in the United States
Educational institutions established in 1925
1925 establishments in Florida